Alfyorovo (Booçı-Arka) is a rural locality (a selo) in Kyzyl-Ozyokskoye Rural Settlement of Mayminsky District, the Altai Republic, Russia. The population was 1467 as of 2016. There are 33 streets.

Geography 
Alfyorovo is located on the right bank of the river Ulalushki, northeast of the city of Gorno-Altaisk, with which the village is connected by regular bus and automobile lighting, 13 km southeast of Mayma (the district's administrative centre) by road. Gorno-Altaisk is the nearest rural locality.

References 

Rural localities in Mayminsky District